Romance of the Three Kingdoms IV: Wall of Fire (released as Sangokushi IV in Japan) is the fourth in the Romance of the Three Kingdoms series of turn-based strategy games produced by Koei and based on the historical novel Romance of the Three Kingdoms. Romance of the Three Kingdoms IV: Wall of Fire was the last game in the series to be released on the PC in the United States until Romance of the Three Kingdoms XI. This was also the last Romance of the Three Kingdoms game to be released on the SNES.

Gameplay
Gameplay is generally similar to the previous installments.

The six scenarios in this game are listed as follows:

Dong Zhuo seizes control of Luoyang (AD 189)
The Flying General roams the Central Plains (AD 194)
Liu Bei seeks shelter in Xinye (AD 201)
The Crouching Dragon soars across Red Cliffs (AD 208)
End of the Han Dynasty - Rise of the Three Kingdoms (AD 221)
A star falls at Wuzhang Plains (AD 235)

Graphics are enhanced in this game and there are additional features such as:

Warships can make other warships catch fire
Archers can fire flaming arrows at other soldiers and catapults
Barbarians can be summoned to conduct raids on enemy territory
Alliances can be formed between the player and other warlords but these are not permanent

Power-up kit
A separate power-up kit was released for the Chinese and Japanese versions of the PC game, allowing further customization of characters in the game. The PlayStation and Sega Saturn ports of the game included the power-up kit.

Three additional scenarios (the first two are not based on the novel) are present in the power-up kit version:

The villain usurps the power of the Han Dynasty - Unification of China (AD 189)
Three heroes compete for power in war-ravaged China (AD 190)
Rise of the barbarian king (AD 225)

Reception

GamePro gave the SNES version a positive review, applauding the upgraded graphics and sounds, the "subtle and even relaxing" music, and the "deep, multilayered menu system", which they said is the most accessible of any game in the series to date. They concluded, "Of course, watching numbers rise and fall really has to thrill you to enjoy any Koei game, but this time the enhanced graphics and smooth command interface seem to hide the number-crunching behind political intrigue and battle strategy. Wall of Fire adds spice to Romance." Next Generation reviewed the SNES version of the game, and stated that "It's beautiful, it's deep and it's absorbing, but it's also just a lot more of the same thing."

On release, Famicom Tsūshin scored the Sega Saturn version of the game a 28 out of 40, later giving the 32X version a 27 out of 40. The four reviewers of Electronic Gaming Monthly applauded the addictive gameplay, the ability to create custom generals, and the level of depth, and commented that the FMVs of the Saturn version were an excellent upgrade to the game. Bro' Buzz of GamePro, though he praised the interface and rewarding gameplay, saw the Saturn version as "virtually identical" to the SNES version.

A Next Generation reviewer commented that the PlayStation version isn't essentially different from the Super NES version, and lacks support for the PlayStation Mouse. He assessed the game itself as a refinement of the formula Koei had been using for years in both the Romance of the Three Kingdoms and Nobunaga's Ambition series. He judged that as a result, the game was the best installment yet of an outstanding series, but would feel over-familiar to Koei's established fans. A GamePro critic was unimpressed with the game. He remarked that it lacks any next generation enhancements aside from the full motion video and compared it unfavorably to its contemporary Iron Storm.

References

External links
Japan Gamecity RTK4 page

1994 video games
Grand strategy video games
4
3DO Interactive Multiplayer games
FM Towns games
NEC PC-9801 games
Sega 32X games
Sega Saturn games
Super Nintendo Entertainment System games
PlayStation (console) games
PlayStation Network games
Turn-based strategy video games
Video games developed in Japan
Virtual Console games
Virtual Console games for Wii U
Windows games
Multiplayer and single-player video games